José María Cornejo Merino (10 November 1788 – 24 November 1864) was a Salvadoran politician. Two times he served as chief of state of El Salvador (1829–30 and 1830–32).

Early life
Cornejo was born in 1788 to José María Cornejo and Jacoba Merino. He married Nicolasa de Lezama.

In Guatemala he studied philosophy, obtaining a diploma on 14 January 1809. Later he studied canon law, but without graduating, and after that civil law, which he also did not finish. He was in Guatemala when the United Provinces of Central America approved inclusion into the First Mexican Empire of Agustín de Iturbide. Because Cornejo opposed this union, he was sent to prison. He was freed in June 1822, and returned to El Salvador.

Career
He was a deputy to the state congress in 1826, 1827 and 1828, when El Salvador was part of the Federal Republic of Central America. Attaining considerable fame, he also became mayor of San Vicente and permanent councilman.

When elections for chief of state were convoked among the towns, Cornejo was the winner. He took possession of the government (still a state within the federation) on 30 January 1829 and governed for a little more than a year, to 16 February 1830.

He served a second term from 4 December 1830 to 30 April 1832. Federal President Francisco Morazán transferred the capital of the Federation from Guatemala City to San Salvador in December 1831, but because of opposition from Cornejo (who opposed the federation), Morazán was forced to leave San Salvador on January 6, 1832. He went to Honduras, where he awaited the arrival of more troops from Nicaragua to reenter El Salvador.

Together with Manuel José Arce Cornejo proclaimed the separation of El Salvador from the Union in 1832. On 17 March of that year the Salvadoran town of Chalatenango pronounced against Cornejo and in favor of the federal government. The town of Metapán did likewise. Morazán attacked San Miguel, El Salvador on 28 February 1832. On 14 March 1832 in the Battle of Jocoro, he defeated Cornejo. On 28 March he defeated him again at San Salvador. Cornejo was taken prisoner and Morazán took over direct control of El Salvador. He called elections for a constituent assembly, which subsequently elected Mariano Prado chief of state and Joaquín de San Martín vice chief of state.

References

External links
 Brief biography from the Salvadoran government web site
 Brief biography
 The war between Cornejo and Morazán

1788 births
1864 deaths
People from San Vicente, El Salvador
Salvadoran people of Spanish descent
Presidents of El Salvador